The Democratic Union of Albanians is a conservative political party of the Albanian minority in Montenegro.

History
The party took part in the campaign prior to Montenegrin independence referendum, promoting Montenegro's independence alongside DPS, SDP, Civic Party and Liberal Party.

In the October 2009 legislative election, the party won one seat. The party president holds the position of Minister for Human and Minority Rights Protection in the Government of Montenegro.

The party's leader, Ferhat Dinosha, is known for being against same-sex marriage in Montenegro, famously quoting that "the Albanian zone in Montenegro was free from homosexuals", and that "if there were any homosexuals in Montenegro, that this would be bad for the country".

Elections

Montenegrin parliament

References

Conservative parties in Montenegro
Albanian political parties in Montenegro